West Hartlepool Rugby Football Club (nicknamed West) is an English rugby union club who play in Durham/Northumberland 1 in the seventh tier of the English rugby union system.

History
West Hartlepool Rugby Football Club was formed in 1881.
 Official Club History

Before the game turned professional, the club enjoyed several seasons in the Courage League and Allied Dunbar premiership during the 1990s before finally being relegated in the 1998–99 season. There followed a drop through the divisions over the next three years that took them out of the national leagues and into the regional leagues.

In the 1990s, when the club was at its peak positions they played at Brierton Lane. When the ground was sold they entered into one year ground share agreements, first with Hartlepool United Football Club at Victoria Park and then with Hartlepool Rovers RFC.

The club's Junior Section then went on to play at West Hartlepool Technical Day School Old Boys RUFC (Tech) for a few years and in the early 2000s there was an agreement with the Hartlepool Sixth Form College for the whole club to play at Brinkburn which is located on Catcote Road.

Honours
 Durham Senior Cup winners (15): 1900, 1902, 1904, 1949, 1952, 1955, 1971, 1972, 1982, 1983, 1984, 1985, 1986, 1989, 2015  
 Courage National 3 champions 1990–91
 North Division 1 East champions (2): 2007–08, 2010–11
 Durham/Northumberland 1 v Yorkshire 1 promotion playoff winners: 2018–19

Club structure
West have two Senior Teams within the club.

 1st team
 2nd team (Stags)
 Vets Team
 Walking Rugby Team

International honours

Other international honours

Mini and junior

West have a very successful mini & junior set up with teams from Little Deers to under-18 with a large percentage going on to represent Durham County & The North.

West Little Deers we’re introduced in 2017 and are for children aged 2-6 - introducing them to Rugby.

Rivals

In the 1990s when West Hartlepool were in the top leagues there was a rivalry with Newcastle Gosforth (now the Newcastle Falcons). However the real derby matches were with Hartlepool Rovers. Even though Rovers have always been in lower leagues the historical Boxing Day match between the sides has continued and Rovers have always given West Hartlepool good competitive matches and beat West in the 2008 Boxing Day derby but West have won all the other years. In recent years the games have come down to the last few seconds or injury time before the eventual winners were known, with side line conversions winning or losing matches.

References

External links
 Official Club Website
 West on RFU.com

Premiership Rugby teams
English rugby union teams
Rugby clubs established in 1881
Sport in Hartlepool
1881 establishments in England
Rugby union in County Durham